Cover to Cover was the second solo concert tour by English recording artist George Michael. The tour spanned 9 months between January and October 1991, comprising 30 shows across the United Kingdom, Brazil, Japan, Canada and the United States.

The tour was not a proper promotion for Listen Without Prejudice Vol. 1. Rather, it was more about Michael singing covers of his favourite songs. Among his favourites was "Don't Let the Sun Go Down on Me", a 1974 song by Elton John. Michael and John had performed the song together at the Live Aid concert in 1985, and again at Michael's concert at Wembley Arena on 23 March 1991, where the duet was recorded. The single was released at the end of 1991 and became a massive hit on both sides of the Atlantic.  In 1993, live performances of "Killer", "Papa Was a Rollin' Stone" and "Calling You" from 22 March 1991 at Wembley Arena formed part of the hugely successful Five Live EP which again topped the Singles Chart in his homeland United Kingdom.  His next tour happened only 15 years later.

Set list
 "Killer" / "Papa Was a Rollin' Stone"
 "Victims"
 "Father Figure"
 "Fame"
 "Waiting for That Day"
 "Ain't No Stoppin' Us Now"
 "Living for the City"
 "Hard Day"
 "Calling You"
 "Lady Marmalade"
 "Back to Life"
 "Faith"
 "Superstition"
 "Tonight"
 "I Believe (When I Fall in Love It Will Be Forever)"
 "Why Did You Do It?"
 ""Baby Don't Change Your Mind"
 "Everything She Wants"
 "Desperado"
 "Mother's Pride"
 "What a Fool Believes"
 "Freedom"
 "Ain't Nobody"
 "Suzanne"
 "I'm Your Man"
 "Every Breath You Take"
 "Sign Your Name"
 "Don't Let the Sun Go Down on Me"
 "I Knew You Were Waiting (For Me)"
 "Careless Whisper"
 "They Won't Go When I Go"
 "Freedom! '90"

Shows

Wembley Arena, March 19/20/22/23 1991 promotional cassette
A free exclusive cassette was given to audience members at the Wembley Arena concerts between 19–23 March.  It contained one previously unreleased track, a cover of "I Believe (When I Fall in Love It Will Be Forever)", which was later released as a b-side to "Don't Let The Sun Go Down On Me".  

Cassette tracklisting
 "I Believe (When I Fall in Love It Will Be Forever)" 
 "Freedom (Back To Reality Mix)"
 "If You Were My Woman" 
 "Fantasy"

References

External links

Official Tour Page
George Michael Concert Archive

1991 concert tours
George Michael concert tours
Orchestral music